The Americas Zone is one of the three zones of regional Davis Cup competition in 2011.

In the Americas Zone there are four different groups in which teams compete against each other to advance to the next group.

The Division IV tournament was held in the Week commencing 13 June 2011 at Santa Cruz, Bolivia

Participating teams

Format
The three teams played a round-robin. The top two teams will be promoted to the Americas Zone Group III for 2012.

It was played on 16–18 June 2011 at the Club de Tenis Santa Cruz in Santa Cruz, Bolivia on outdoor clay courts.

Group

Trinidad & Tobago vs. U.S. Virgin Islands

Panama vs. U.S. Virgin Islands

Panama vs. Trinidad & Tobago

References

External links
Davis Cup draw details

Americas Zone Group IV
Davis Cup Americas Zone